Goga may refer to:

People

Surname
 Dorin Goga (born 1984), Romanian footballer
 Lefter Goga (192197), Albanian politician
 Moukaila Goga (born 1987), Togolese footballer
 Octavian Goga (18811938), Romanian politician and writer
 Petro Goga, Albanian politician

Given name
 Goga Ashkenazi (born Gaukhar Yerkinovna Berkalieva, 1980), Kazakh-Russian businesswoman and socialite
 Goga Bitadze (born 1999), Georgian basketball player
 Goga Kapoor (Ravinder Kapoor, 19402011), Indian film actor
 Goga Khachidze (Giorgi Khachidze, born 1974), Georgian politician
 Goga Pahalwan (before 19481981), Pakistani wrestler
 Goga Sekulić (born 1977), Serbian turbo-folk singer

Places 
 Ghogha, a village and seaport in Gujarat, historically referred as Gogo or Gogha
 Goga, a village in Râfov Commune, Prahova County, Romania
 Goga, Iran, a village in Gilan Province, Iran
 Üçbulaq, Fizuli, Azerbaijan, a village also known as Goga

Other uses 
 Gogaji, a folk deity of Rajasthan state, India also known as "Goga"

See also 
 Thanasis Gogas (born 1980), Greek footballer
 

Albanian-language surnames
Romanian-language surnames